William Matthew Scobie Huffer (born 30 October 1998) is an English footballer who plays as a goalkeeper for Burgess Hill Town.

Career

Leeds United
Huffer started his career at Leeds United's youth academy from an early age. On 21 December 2017, Huffer signed his first professional contract.

He made his first appearance for Leeds' first team in a pre-season friendly 1–1 draw against York City on 20 July 2018, under recently appointed Leeds' head coach Marcelo Bielsa.

Huffer was given the number 13 shirt for the upcoming 2018–19 season for Leeds. His first call up to a senior first-team match was on 14 August when he was named on the bench in the EFL Cup win against Bolton Wanderers.

He made his debut on 24 November 2018 in the EFL Championship against Bristol City, keeping a clean sheet in a 2–0 win, after being named in the starting lineup after injuries to Bailey Peacock-Farrell and Jamal Blackman. He remained Leeds' second choice goalkeeper until the signing of Spanish international goalkeeper Kiko Casilla from Real Madrid in January 2019.

Barnet (loan)
Huffer joined Barnet on a one-month loan on 25 January 2019. He made his debut for the club on 28 January, starting in a 3–3 draw as Barnet caused an FA Cup upset to earn a replay against Championship opposition Brentford. After five appearances in all competitions, Leeds recalled Huffer from his loan due to an injury to Kamil Miazek.

Return to Leeds
On 18 May 2019, Leeds announced that Huffer, alongside fellow goalkeeper Kamil Miazek, had extended his contract by one year, with the club having taken up an automatic option on their existing contracts.

Huffer left Leeds in summer 2020 when his contract was not renewed.

Bradford (Park Avenue)
He joined Bradford (Park Avenue) on a short-term deal on 3 November 2020.

Bradford City
On 7 January 2021, Huffer signed for League Two side Bradford City with the terms of the transfer undisclosed. On 12 May 2021 he was one of nine players that Bradford City announced would leave the club on 30 June 2021 when their contracts expire.

Stalybridge Celtic
After a brief spell at AFC Telford United, where he was an unused substitute on one occasion, he signed for Stalybridge Celtic in October 2021. He left the club in January 2022, having made eleven appearances for the club, including seven in the league.

Burgess Hill Town
Huffer joined Burgess Hill Town in January 2022 and later signed a contract until the end of the 2022-23 season.

International career
Huffer has represented England at several international levels including under-18. Including proving to be the hero for England under-17's in 2015 saving a penalty in the World Cup Playoff Place game against Spain under-17's to qualify for the Under 17's World Cup in Chile.

He was called up to the England U20 squad in 2018.

Style of play
Yorkshire Evening Post journalist Joe Urqhuart compared Huffer's goalkeeping style similar to former England goalkeeper Joe Hart. With Huffer also described as 'tall, commanding and loud'.

Personal life
In his second year as a professional at Leeds United, Huffer started a degree in classical history in Open University.

Career statistics

References 

1998 births
Living people
English footballers
England youth international footballers
Association football goalkeepers
Leeds United F.C. players
Barnet F.C. players
Bradford (Park Avenue) A.F.C. players
Bradford City A.F.C. players
AFC Telford United players
Stalybridge Celtic F.C. players
Burgess Hill Town F.C. players
English Football League players
National League (English football) players
Northern Premier League players
Isthmian League players
Footballers from Wandsworth